The Men's individual kata competition at the 2021 World Karate Championships was held from 18 to 20 November 2021.

Results

Round 1

Round 2

Round 3

Finals

References

External links
Draw

Men's individual kata